"Did Google Manipulate Search for Hillary?" is a 2016 YouTube video uploaded by SourceFed.

Background and release
Released on June 9, 2016, "Did Google Manipulate Search for Hillary?" featured SourceFed host Matt Lieberman discussing whether or not Google manipulated search results to display Hillary Clinton in an untruthful positive light. At the time, Clinton was the Democratic Party's presumptive nominee for President of the United States in the 2016 election. 

The video's original description stated that production on the video began "while researching for a wrap-up on the June 7 Presidential Primaries." It was part of the channel's SourceFed News series; hosts on the channel referred to these uploads as "white wall" videos, as they featured one or two hosts discussing news stories against a white background. Matt Lieberman, the host for the video, suggested that Google's autofill feature pulls up results for Clinton's crime reform, despite "hillary clinton crime" being a more popular search term than "Hillary Clinton crime reform". During the video, Lieberman stated, "Thanks to the help of our editor Spencer Reed, SourceFed has discovered that Google has been actively altering search recommendations in favor of Hillary Clinton's campaign so quietly that we were unable to see it for what it was until today." 

Lieberman did emphasize that SourceFed was not accusing Google of any crimes, instead calling the manipulation "deeply unethical and wrong but not illegal." Lieberman also added that there is no evidence to suggest collusion between the Clinton campaign and Google, but went on to claim that "the intention is clear: Google is burying potential searches for terms that could have hurt Hillary Clinton in the primary elections over the past several months."

Reception
The video attracted considerably more media attention than other SourceFed uploads, as it was referred to in posts by USA Today, The Washington Times, Business Insider, and The Globe and Mail, among other outlets. Shane Dingman, writing for The Globe and Mail opined that "This conspiracy theory post is not typical fare for comedy-focused SourceFed to offer its 1.7 million subscribers." Nick Corasaniti of the New York Times wrote that the "conspiracy theory [about Google suppressing negative news in search results about Hillary Clinton] began with a video from the online outlet SourceFed that went viral this year, and quickly garnered headlines on conservative news sites like Breitbart and InfoWars." Business Insider replicated the experiment shown in the video and found similar results. 

The video's claims also drew responses from Donald Trump, who at the time was the Republican Party's presumptive nominee for President of United States. Trump stated that if SourceFed's claims were true, "it is a disgrace that Google would do that."

SourceFed creator Philip DeFranco accounted that many of his fans wanted to know his thoughts on the video, due to his past ties with SourceFed. In his response, he clarified that he had no creative control on the channel's uploads, and went on to say that the video's claims were "potentially concerning," adding "I think and I'm hoping that there's a non-nefarious explanation, [...] personally, I would love to hear from Google if they would issue a statement on this." 

Google also responded, defending its search engine; one representative of the company stated "Google Autocomplete does not favor any candidate or cause. Claims to the contrary simply misunderstand how Autocomplete works. Our Autocomplete algorithm will not show a predicted query that is offensive or disparaging when displayed in conjunction with a person's name." Matt Cutts, Google's former head of their web spam team, called the video's claims "simply false." Cutts also reported that SourceFed did not reach out to Google prior to uploading their video.

The video ultimately attracted over 1 million views, before being made private.

References

Primary sources

2016 United States Democratic presidential primaries
2016 United States presidential election in popular culture
2016 YouTube videos
Controversies of the 2016 United States presidential election
Criticism of Google
Hillary Clinton controversies
SourceFed
Works about Google
Works about Hillary Clinton